Circled plus (⊕) or  n-ary circled plus (⨁) (in Unicode) may refer to:

 Direct sum, an operation from abstract algebra
 Dilation (morphology), mathematical morphology
 Exclusive or, a logical operation that outputs true only when inputs differ

See also

 
  (such as )
 
 Screw drives
Phillips head screw  
Posidriv head screw  
JIS B 1012 head screw  
 . This symbol has many variants and many uses.
 . One of these is 
 , includes the ideogram 
 , whose earliest form was that of the Phoenician letter Teth 
 
 , includes the letter 
 . The symbol used for the product operator is 
 ⊖ (disambiguation)